Vagrant Island is the northern of two islands just west of Rambler Island in the Bragg Islands, lying in Crystal Sound about  north of Cape Rey, Graham Land. Mapped from surveys by Falkland Islands Dependencies Survey (FIDS) (1958–59). The name derives from association with Rambler Island.

See also 
List of Antarctic and sub-Antarctic islands
 

Islands of Graham Land
Graham Coast